Wh-agreement refers to morphological changes triggered by wh-movement, usually in verbs or complementisers. It occurs in a number of Bantu languages, Austronesian languages including Chamorro and Palauan, Algonquin languages such as Ojibwe, as well as Hausa, French, Scottish Gaelic, and Irish.

For example, in Chamorro, the infix -um- (labelled "WH[nom]") is attached to the verb to mark agreement with the nominative question phrase following subject extraction:

Additionally, some languages have distinct agreement morphology depending on the case of element being moved. In the case of object extraction in Chamorro, the verb fa'gasi instead becomes fina’gasése (marked with "WH[obj]"):

In French and Scottish Gaelic, special complementisers are used in cases of wh-movement:

References

Linguistic morphology